Toby Michael C. A. Hemingway (born 28 May 1983) is an English actor. He is known for playing Reid Garwin in the 2006 supernatural thriller The Covenant, and for his other film roles in Black Swan, Into the Darkness, Street and Playback.

Early life
The son of authors Mike and Anna-Maria Hemingway, Toby Hemingway was born in Brighton, Sussex, where he spent his childhood with his older brother, Jay. At thirteen, he moved to Ojai, California, USA with his mother.

After graduating from high school in 2001 from Laurel Springs School, which provides homeschooling and online education, he attended American Academy of Dramatic Arts in New York City where he earned an associate degree in Fine Arts.

Acting career
In 2005, he appeared in select episodes of the series Summerland and Bones. The following year, he had his first major film role in The Covenant. In 2007, he went on to star in Feast of Love and in 2008, he appeared in select episodes of CSI: Miami. In July 2010, he played the love interest in Taylor Swift's music video "Mine". Later in 2010, he landed a minor role in Black Swan.

In 2012, Hemingway played a supporting role on The Finder as Willa's romani cousin Timo Proud.

Filmography

Television

References

External links

1983 births
English male film actors
English male television actors
Living people
People from Brighton
People from Greater Los Angeles
People from Ojai, California
English expatriates in the United States